Nagoda Royal National College (also known as Royal College Nagoda or Nagoda Royal College or Rajakeeya National School) is a national school in Nagoda, Sri Lanka.

See also
 List of schools in Southern Province, Sri Lanka

References

External links
 

Educational institutions established in 1876
National schools in Sri Lanka
Schools in Galle District
1876 establishments in Ceylon